Darma is a rural municipality located in Salyan District of Karnali Province of Nepal.

It Has established by including 3 VDCs named Dhakadam, Valchaur and Darmakot. The total area of darma rural municipality is 81.46 sq.km

Demographics
At the time of the 2011 Nepal census, Darma Rural Municipality had a population of 19,966. Of these, 100.0% spoke Nepali as their first language.

In terms of ethnicity/caste, 62.7% were Chhetri, 19.7% Kami, 11.3% Thakuri, 2.5% Damai/Dholi, 1.8% Hill Brahmin, 1.0% Magar, 0.9% Sarki and 0.1% other Terai.

In terms of religion, 99.5% were Hindu and 0.5% Christian.

References

External links
 Official website

Populated places in Salyan District, Nepal
Rural municipalities in Karnali Province
Rural municipalities of Nepal established in 2017